Hereditary neuropathy with liability to pressure palsy (HNPP) is a peripheral neuropathy, a condition that affects the nerves. Pressure on the nerves can cause tingling sensations, numbness, pain, weakness, muscle atrophy and even paralysis of the affected area. In normal individuals, these symptoms disappear quickly, but in sufferers of HNPP even a short period of pressure can cause the symptoms to occur. Palsies can last from minutes or days to weeks or even months.

HNPP is caused by a mutation in the gene PMP22, which makes peripheral myelin protein 22. This protein has a role in the maintenance of the myelin sheath that insulates nerves, resulting in insufficient conductivity in the nerves. HNPP is part of the group of hereditary motor and sensory neuropathy (HMSN) disorders and is linked to Charcot–Marie–Tooth disease (CMT).

Signs and symptoms

Symptoms and symptom onset vary; some individuals are diagnosed in childhood, others in adulthood, some report minor problems, whilst others experience severe discomfort and disability. In many cases, symptoms are mild enough to go unnoticed. The time period between episodes is known to vary between individuals. HNPP has not been found to alter the lifespan, although in some cases a decline in quality of life is noticed. Some sufferers (10–15%) report various pains growing in severity with progression of the disease. The nerves most commonly affected are the peroneal nerve at the fibular head (leg and feet), the ulnar nerve at the elbow (arm) and the median nerve at the wrist (palm, thumbs and fingers), but any peripheral nerve can be affected.
Among the signs/symptoms are the following (different symptoms are caused by different nerves, such as the foot drop caused by the peroneal nerve):

Causes

The condition is caused by a mutation in one copy of the gene PMP22 (peripheral myelin protein 22, located at locus 17p11.2). This makes it autosomal dominant. PMP22 is involved in maintaining the myelin sheath that surrounds nerves to facilitate conductivity. The mutation causes haploinsufficiency, where the activity of the normal gene is insufficient to compensate for the loss of function of the other gene.

Genetics

The peripheral myelin protein 22 gene encodes a 22-kD protein that comprises 2 to 5% of peripheral nervous system myelin.

Overlap with Charcot–Marie–Tooth disease type 1A has been found in Gly94fsX222 (c.281_282insG), due to point mutations in PMP22 that occur in a minority of cases of HNPP. The point mutations missense, nonsense and splice-site have each been alluded to in HNPP.

Diagnosis

Measuring nerve conduction velocity may give an indication of the presence of the disease. Other methods via which to ascertain the diagnosis of HNPP are:
 Family history
 Genetic test
Proband
Multi-gene panel
 Physical exam (lack of ankle reflex)

Treatment

There is no current treatment, however management of HNPP can be done via:
 Physical therapist
 Occupational therapist
 Ankle/foot orthosis
 Wrist splint
 Avoid repetitive movements

Epidemiology
HNPP is a rare disorder. Partly because it is so rare and partly because many people who have it only experience mild symptoms, it is difficult to tell what percentage of people have it. One range of estimates is from one in 50,000 up to about one in 33,333. Another is from one in 119,049 up to one in 6,250. In a study of newborns in Korea who all got a genetic test for the disorder, around one in 1,698 of the newborns had it.

History

Inherited peripheral nervous system disorders were first described by Charcot, Marie and Tooth (1886). De Jong (1947) first described HNPP in a Dutch family. Dyck and Lambert (1968) showed nerve conduction studies, and Chance et al. (1993) detected the chromosome deletion in most of the individuals with the HNPP condition.

See also
 Hereditary motor and sensory neuropathy

References

Further reading

External links 

Neurological disorders